Paracercion is a small genus of damselflies in the family Coenagrionidae.They are commonly known as Lilysquatters.

The genus includes the following species:
Paracercion barbatum 
Paracercion calamorum  - Dusky Lilysquatter
Paracercion hieroglyphicum 
Paracercion impar 
Paracercion malayanum 
Paracercion melanotum  - Eastern Lilysquatter
Paracercion plagiosum 
Paracercion sieboldii 
Paracercion v-nigrum

References

Coenagrionidae
Zygoptera genera